Northwest Bakersfield (commonly referred to simply as The Northwest) is the northwest region of Bakersfield, California. It is bounded by the Kern River/Stockdale Highway to the south and State Route 99 to the east. The other boundaries are the city limits themselves.

Historically this region was rural, with the farming communities of Fruitvale, Rosedale, and Greenacres. However, starting in the mid-1990s, this region started experiencing significant growth. The city limits have reached the boundaries of these communities.

The area incorporated by the city is primarily residential and retail, including some commercial. The area that is unincorporated is primarily industrial.

Neighborhoods

Bakersfield Commons
Bakersfield Commons is a planned mixed-use project in the northwest. Its exact boundaries are currently unknown, but it will contain land at the intersection of Coffee Road and Brimhall Road. The development will be constructed in three phases and take approximately 20 years to complete. It will use a building policy where residential, commercial and retail will be built closely together to allow for easy access by foot.

Bakersfield Commons will also contain a new retail shopping center. Its design will imitate a main street similar to The Grove in Los Angeles. According to advertisements from the developer, the goal will be to bring new businesses from outside the city, instead of adding locations for existing businesses.

Riverlakes Ranch
Riverlakes Ranch is a neighborhood in the northwest. Starting north and traveling clockwise, it is roughly bounded by Olive Drive, Coffee Road, Rosedale Highway, and Allen Road. East of Coffee Road, there is a small segment that extends south to Fruitvale Avenue, next to the town of Fruitvale. It is a mixture of residential, commercial and retail developments. The centerpiece of Riverlakes Ranch is The Links at Riverlakes Ranch public golf course. The design of the course was inspired by Scottish golf courses. Riverlakes Ranch also contains the Northwest Promenade, a shopping center nearly a mile long that contains anchors such as Walmart, Target, The Home Depot, Office Depot, Ross Dress for Less, Kohl's, Best Buy, Petco, Dick's Sporting Goods, and Cost Plus World Market.

References

External links
Bakersfield Commons Project

Neighborhoods in Bakersfield, California